Granger may refer to:

People
Granger (name)
Hermione Granger, a fictional character in Harry Potter

United States
 Granger, Indiana
 Granger, Iowa
 Granger, Minnesota
 Granger, Missouri
 Granger, New York
 Granger, Ohio
 Granger, Texas
 Granger Township, Ohio
 Granger, a neighborhood in West Valley City, Utah
 Granger, Washington
 Granger, Wyoming

Other places
 Granger, Grand'Anse, a rural settlement in Haiti

Other

 Granger, one involved in The National Grange of the Order of Patrons of Husbandry (the Grange Movement)
Gabor Granger, a method of price determination
Granger causality
Tex Granger, a movie serial
 Granger or Advanced Granger, the green 6-legged Alien builder classes from Tremulous

See also
 Grainger (disambiguation)
 Justice Granger (disambiguation)